Aexpa S.A. is a charter airline based at Matecaña International Airport in Pereira, Colombia. The full name is "Aero Expreso del Pacífico". The airline was founded in May 2001.

It carries passengers and cargo charter flights in the Pacific coast and the coffee region. It has 3 small aircraft, making it a fixed route network, but on request they fly to almost all airports in the region. 

The aircraft used are 2 Cessna C401/402, 1 Piper PA-34 Seneca.

In a statement posted on their Facebook page on March 17, 2020, they announced the suspension of their operations with a tentative date of March 30, depending on the evolution of the COVID-19 pandemic.

Services
Buenaventura
Cali
Condoto
Medellín
Nuqui
Pizarro
Quibdo
Vigia del Fuerte

References

External links

 Aexpa 

Airlines of Colombia
Airlines established in 2001
Colombian companies established in 2001